General of Army of Ukraine Serhiy Kyrychenko (born 4 May 1952) was the 9th Chief of the General Staff and Commander-in-Chief of the Armed Forces of Ukraine.

Early career 
Serhiy Kyrychenko was born in 1952 in Novoselivka, a small village in the Kharkiv Oblast, Ukraine to a working-class family.

Education 
In 1973 Serhiy Kyrychenko graduated from Kharkiv Armour Command school.
In 1983 he graduated from command faculty of Malinovsky Military Armored Forces Academy.
In 2000 Serhiy Kyrychenko graduated from the faculty of preparation of the operational-strategic level officers’ of the National Academy of Defence of Ukraine with golden medal.

Assignments 
Serhiy Kyrychenko started his military career in Kyiv Military District as commander of armour platoon. During 1975–1992, he occupied positions of armour company commander, chief of staff of armour battalion, chief of staff of armour regiment, commander of armour regiment and deputy division commander.

In 1992, after the fall of the Soviet Union, he joined the newly established Armed Forces of Ukraine. Until 2002, he served as commander of 128th mechanized division, chief of staff of the Army Corps and commander of the 13th Army Corps.

April 2002 Serhiy Kyrychenko was assigned on position of Deputy of the Chief of Staff of the Armed Forces of Ukraine. He was promoted to position of the Chief of the General Staff – the first Deputy of the Commander-in-Chief of the Army of the Armed Forces of Ukraine in January 2003 and remained in that position until July 2004.

On June 6, 2005, by Decree # 961/2005 of the President of Ukraine Viktor Yushchenko, he was assigned to be the Chief of the General Staff – Commander-in-Chief of the Armed Forces of Ukraine.

Dates of rank
Lieutenant, : 1973
Colonel, 128th Mechanized Division:
Major General, : August 23, 1995
Lieutenant General, 13th Army Corps: 2002
Colonel General, General Staff: January 2005
General of Army of Ukraine, General Staff: August 21, 2007

Awards and decorations 
Serhiy Kyrychenko earned the following decorations and awards:
 10 Years Military Service
 15 Years Military Service
 20 Years Military Service
Order of Bohdan Khmelnytsky Third Class – August 21, 2006
For perfect service ІІІ-rd grade
10 years of Ukrainian Armed Forces
Decoration of the Minister of Defense “Veteran of military service”

References 

1952 births
Living people
People from Kharkiv Oblast
Generals of the Army (Ukraine)
Chiefs of the General Staff (Ukraine)
Recipients of the Order of Bohdan Khmelnytsky, 3rd class